The Third Fillon government was the 34th government in the Fifth Republic of France. It was formed on 14 November 2010. It is composed of members from the UMP and the NC. On 10 May 2012, following the election defeat of President Nicolas Sarkozy in the 2012 presidential election, François Fillon presented the resignation of the Government. However, the government continued to manage daily affairs until the appointment of a new prime minister by the new President of the Republic.

Prime Minister

Ministers

Junior Ministers

Secretaries of State

References

François Fillon
Nicolas Sarkozy
2010 establishments in France
2012 disestablishments in France
Cabinets established in 2010
Cabinets disestablished in 2012
French governments